The 1939 Auckland Rugby League season was its 31st. 

Mount Albert United won their first ever Fox Memorial Shield title with a 13 win, 1 draw, 2 loss record. North Shore Albions were 6 competition points further back. After 12 rounds Mount Albert (17) trailed North Shore (18) by one competition point before North Shore could only secure a win and a draw from their last 5 matches while Mount Albert won all five to run away with the title.

Marist Old Boys beat Mount Albert in the Roope Rooster final 13–11. This was the 5th time Marist had won the Roope Rooster. A week later Mount Albert beat Marist 15–9 to win the Stormont Shield (champion of champions) for the first time. City Rovers won the Phelan Shield when they beat Richmond Rovers 15–12 in the final. This was the first time they had won the Phelan Shield which was played for by teams knocked out of the Roope Rooster in the first two rounds.

Richmond won the reserve grade competition ahead of Mount Albert and Ponsonby United. They also won the reserve grade knockout competition (Stallard Cup) when they beat Otahuhu Rovers in the final. Otahuhu had competed in the senior B grade but asked to compete for the Stallard Cup after they had won the senior B championship (Sharman Cup). Otahuhu also won the senior B knockout competition beating Ellerslie United 5–3 in the final. Ellerslie claimed the Foster Shield.

The representative season to an extent was focussed on helping the selectors choose the New Zealand team to tour England and France. Auckland played matches against South Auckland and Wellington while the traditional Inter-Island match was also played at Carlaw Park. Two New Zealand trial matches were played at the same venue and were heavily populated by Auckland players. The Tāmaki (Auckland Māori) side played 2 matches against Auckland Pākehā with the sides splitting them, one win a piece. On June 11 the Māori side played South Auckland in Huntly with the South Auckland team winning. They also played the first ever Bay of Plenty Māori side for the Waitangi Shield with the teams deadlocked 3–3 at full time. Another Waitangi Shield defence was scheduled for August 31 but was postponed due to bad weather. It was then cancelled altogether because of petrol restrictions due to the looming outbreak of war meaning the Taranaki Māori side couldn't get a license to travel. At the start of the season an Eastern Suburbs side (though with several players from other clubs) visited Auckland and played 4 matches against Auckland club sides. They beat Marist (22-9), lost to Richmond (16-17), lost to Mount Albert (11-16), and then beat Manukau (23-10).

Auckland Rugby League news

Annual meeting
The report presented at the annual meeting on March 8 stated: "there was again a marked increase in revenue from gate and grandstand receipts and ground rates, the respective figures being: 1937, £3410; 1938, £3761 18s 5d [with] the tour of the Sydney Eastern Suburbs team [being] a material factor in this increase. There had been an increase in expenditure from £160 to £312 due to the increased length of the season, more travel, and more insurance payments to cover injured players hospital treatment. The surplus for the season to be transferred to the appropriation account was £1439". Grants to clubs had amounted to £628 4s 7d. Mention was also made of the loss of several “notable stalwarts, including the late Messrs. Charles Seagar, William James Liversidge, T. Bellamy, and R. Badiley”. The annual meeting was held on March 8 with Mr. John A. Lee, M.P. presiding. He said that “the code was steadily progressing so far as the quality of players and public esteem were concerned”. Ivan Culpan was congratulated on reaching his twenty-first year in office. Mr. G. Grey Campbell referred to the generosity of vice-president, Mr. R.H. Wood who had presented “the handsome Edith Wood Roll of Honour for the inscription of the names of men who had given 25 years of continuous special service. The gift was dedicated to the memory of the donor’s wife. The memorial was draped with the flags of all the clubs”. Election of officers were as follows:-Patron Mr. J.F.W. Dickson; president, Mr. John A. Lee, M.P.; vice-presidents, Sir Ernest Davis, Messrs. J. Donald, C. Drysdale, H. Grange, R.J. Land, W.J. Lovatt, E. Morton, Frederick William Schramm, M.P., W. Wallace, W.H. Brien, L. Coakly, H. Luke, R.D. Bagnall, O. Blackwood, E. Montgomery, T.G. Symonds, G.T. Wright, R.H. Benson, auditors being Messrs. Allan Moody, E. Grey and J.C. Gleeson; trustees, Messrs. G. Grey Campbell (chairman) and E.J. Phelan and A. Stormont; control board, Messrs. G. Grey Campbell (chairman), E.J. Phelan (deputy), John F. McAneny, T. Davis, J.W. Probert and Jim Rukutai (re-elected by clubs), William Mincham (Referees’ Association), D. Wilkie (chairman junior management), R. Doble (delegate to New Zealand Council), Mr. Ivan Culpan (hon. secretary) and Mr. J.E. Knowling (hon. treasurer); auditor, Mr. Robert Arthur Spinley; solicitor, Mr. H.M. Rogerson; time keepers, Messrs. T. Hill and A.E. Chapman; representatives n referees appointment board, Messrs. R. Benson with T. Davis as deputy; appointment board, Messrs. Percy Rogers, R. Benson and G. Grey Campbell; committees were allocated the same as last year; hon physicians, Drs. F.J. Gwynne, H.N. Holdgate, S. Morris, G.W. Lock, J.N. Waddell, M.G. Pezaro, H. Burrell and W. Bridgman. Following R. Doble's July appointment as co-manager of the New Zealand team to tour England and France a reshuffle was needed of officials at Auckland Rugby League. Mr. Francis Thomas McAneny was asked to deputise on the New Zealand Council pending a permanent appointment. Mr. E. Chapman was chosen as Press and call steward at Carlaw Park and Mr. Probert was elected to the insurance committee.

Junior Control Board
Their annual report from the 1938 season stated that 55 teams took part in junior competitions with 1123 players registered. The ladies social committee “paid over 200 visits to the sick and needy” with many players expressing their “thanks for their generosity and kindness”. The ladies committee also managed all the social functions of the control board. In 1937 club delegates had formed the Amalgamated Senior Clubs' Officers Association and through their efforts £300 had been contributed to help players in need.

Honours board
At the control board meeting on February 15 “consideration was given to the list of names to be inscribed on the honours’ board, which will be a record of those who have given 25 years of continuous service to the code in Auckland". At their March 1 meeting chairman Campbell “stated that the roll of honour … would be unveiled at the annual meeting” the following week. At the annual meeting on March 8 the memorial was unveiled with the names being D.W. Mclean, founder of the New Zealand Rugby League, and James Carlaw (deceased), Messrs. Ernie Asher, R.H. Benson, A.J. Ferguson, Ivan Culpan, B Longbottom, C. Raynes, A. Campney, Freeman Thompson, W.J. Liversidge, W. Mincham, and M.J. Hooper. Chairman Campbell said that other names were to be added. On August 7 Mr. W. Mincham reported that the name of Mr. Les Edgar Bull was being added to the Roll of Honour board. He was the association president and had been a key figure in Auckland refereeing for many years.

Pre-season
At the board of control meeting on February 22 it was decided to notify clubs that Carlaw Park “would be available for regular training after next Saturday and to engage a coach to attend the park to conduct free physical culture and loosening exercises for players from 7:30 pm to 8pm tonight week and the following Tuesday and Thursday evenings” with “his services open to all players”. At the same meeting the board congratulated Verdun Scott of the North Shore Albions who had scored a record 235 not out recently in club cricket.

Sydney combined side tour
It was organised that the Balmain club would tour Auckland playing three matches over the Easter weekend before returning to Australia to begin their season. A week later however the club informed the authorities in New Zealand that they would not be able to come as "several players were not available". The Auckland Rugby League then engaged in a “lengthy radio-telephone conversation with Australia” on February 15 that left them “practically certain that one of the leading club teams of Sydney will play at Carlaw Park at Easter in lieu of Balmain”. Ray Stehr of Eastern Suburbs had also been reported as saying that he could get together a very strong composite team made up of Eastern Suburbs and Balmain players to tour. The team was eventually granted permission to tour and four matches were arranged for Carlaw Park against Marist, Richmond, Mount Albert, and Manukau. The touring side was particularly strong and included good players from several clubs: Jim Sharman, J. Robinson (W. Suburbs), Frank Hyde, Jim Quealey, Jack Redman, Frank Griffiths, George Watt (Balmain), Roy Thompson (N. Sydney), Don Manson (S. Sydney), Aub Mitchell (Canterbury-Bankstown), Fred Tottey, Rod O'Loan, Laurie Pickup, Jack McCarthy, Jack Arnold, Harry Pierce, and Ray Stehr (E. Suburbs). The tour raised £300 for the injured players fund.

Before the kickoff of the first match between Marist and Sydney XIII both teams stood in silence and wore arm bands as a mark of respect for the late Prime Minister of Australia, Mr. Joseph Lyons who had died in office 13 days earlier on April 7. Robert Grotte was sent off for Marist and was later suspended for 2 games. John Anderson, normally one of the most reliable place kickers in New Zealand missed 5 first half shots at goal and another in the second half, while Murdoch also missed one.

Broadhead had to leave the field injured early in the second half for Richmond. A relay race was run during the afternoon between 4 senior club teams including the Sydney side. The Ponsonby team won by 2 yards ahead of Sydney with Brian Riley, Arthur Kay, Jack Campbell, and P Young running for the winners.

Harold Milliken, Dave Solomon and Bruce Donaldson switch codes
It was reported on March 21 that Harold Milliken, an All Black in 1937-38 was moving from Christchurch to Auckland and would play for the Papakura club. At the same time the Auckland rugby representative five eighth, Bruce Donaldson also switched codes and joined the Mount Albert side. He ultimately topped the point scoring for the season with 117 points. On May 20 Dave Solomon who had played for the All Blacks in 1935-36 switched to rugby league and joined Richmond. He debuted for them in their May 20 match with Papakura.

Return of Bob Banham, George Nepia, and Hawea Mataira
Bob Banham the Australian who had been recruited by Auckland Rugby League in 1938 as a player-coach was returning to Auckland for the 1939 season. The previous year he had played and coached at North Shore Albions (5 games), and City Rovers (12 games), with 2 other appearances for Newton Rangers as a guest. Mount Albert United had secured his services as a player coach. Hawea Mataira, who had played for City Rovers in 1937 before returning to the East Coast for 1938 was once again back in Auckland and playing for his former side. George Nepia had also returned to Auckland to play for Manukau Rovers. He had played for them briefly in 1938 before leaving for Gisborne after he pulled out of the New Zealand team to tour Australia for personal reasons. He was joining Manukau as a player -coach.

Newmarket Rugby League Football Club revival
On February 6 a special meeting was held at the Municipal Hall for the Newmarket Rugby League Football Club and they were “revived” as a result. The mayor of Newmarket was presiding over the meeting. The Auckland Rugby League granted them affiliation as a junior club. The club had last fielded junior teams in 1931 when they won the 6th grade A competition, after starting out with a solitary schoolboys side in 1926.

Carlaw Park
Improvements were made to the Carlaw Park entrance gates with the work completed by May 6 at a cost of £200. Work was also intended to be carried out on the “eastern end of the grandstand, to prevent rain beating in”.

Obituaries

William James Barningham Liversidge
On December 26, 1938, William Liversidge had a heart attack and died in the pavilion of the Auckland Bowling Club whilst competing in a bowls tournament. He was aged just 50 at the time of his death. Liversidge was a member of the Men's fours national champions in 1935 from the Grey Lynn club along with Auckland referee and father of Ted Mincham, William Mincham. He had been involved in Auckland rugby league "since its inception" and was a life member of the Auckland Rugby League. He had also been on the committee of the Maritime Football Club from 1919 onwards. At the Auckland control board meeting on February 2 chairman Campbell said that "Mr Liversidge was a progressive administrator of ability and for many years had served the game well, giving keen support to the Auckland League as well as to the national management". Liversidge was an employee of the waterworks department of the City Council. He was buried at Waikumete Cemetery on the 28th.

Representative season
At the control board meeting on March 15 there were four nominations for the three positions of Auckland selectors. As the result of a ballot Messrs. Hec Brisbane, Bert Avery, and Bill Cloke were elected. Auckland played two matches, the first against South Auckland (Waikato) on August 5 resulting in a 26–17 win while they defeated Wellington 23–9 on September 2. An Auckland Pākehā side played the Tamaki (Auckland Māori) side on two occasions with the Māori side winning the first 19-15 (June 5), and the Pākehā 
side the second 15-12 (September 30). The Māori side also played a Bay of Plenty Māori team on August 24 with the match drawn 3-3. Other matches were played by Māori teams against South Auckland sides but the results were not well reported. They were also scheduled to play against the Taranaki Māori side but the match was postponed due to the weather and then cancelled due to government imposed petrol restrictions with war looming. the annual inter-island match between the North Island and South Island was also played at Carlaw Park and was won 35-13 by the North Island which was dominated by Auckland players as was the norm. There were also 2 New Zealand trial matches played at Carlaw Park again featuring a large number of Auckland players.

Auckland players chosen for New Zealand tour of England and France
In July the New Zealand team to tour England and France was named in 3 stages. The following players from Auckland were selected:- Bob Banham (Mount Albert), Tom Chase (Manukau), Jack Hemi (Manukau), Ross Jones (North Shore), Arthur Kay, Bert Leatherbarrow, Hawea Mataira (City), Arthur McInnarney (Mount Albert), George Mitchell (Richmond), Harold Milliken (Papakura), Laurie Mills (Richmond), Pita Ririnui (Manukau), Verdun Scott (North Shore), Jack Smith, Dave Solomon (Richmond), Ivor Stirling (North Shore), Wally Tittleton (Richmond). The Auckland Rugby League chairman, Mr. G. Grey Campbell was appointed co-manager for the tour, along with Mr. J.A. Redwood. On July 15 a complimentary dinner was held at Hotel Auckland in the evening to farewell the managers and Auckland players selected. The team was toasted by Mr. J.A. Lee, M.P., and replied to by Bob Banham and Hawea Mataira. Each of “the Auckland players was presented with a travelling case on behalf” of Auckland Rugby League. Campbell withdrew as co-manager on July 23 following several medical checks on his health. He “had recently had a severe attack of influenza, and the doctors were unanimously of the opinion that it would not be in the best interests of his health to undertake such a strenuous tour at the present time” He was replaced as co-manager by Mr. R. Doble who was the Auckland delegate to the New Zealand Rugby League Council.

On July 22 at Carlaw Park during the afternoon of regular club matches the Auckland players were farewelled by all the junior teams.
The schoolboys marched in their playing gear and “formed huge letters N.Z. in the background”. Members of the New Zealand team “assembled in front of the grandstand and a loud speaker system was used to carry the farewell messages of a dozen speakers”. The New Zealand Herald reported that “a feature of the occasion was the dedication in Māori of the New Zealand ensign and the ceremony was carried out by Mr. T.P. Kewene, on behalf of the Māori Control Board. The address was interpreted by Mr. P.K. Paikea, M.P. for the Northern Māori district, as an incantation of guidance and blessing to the team when abroad. Presentations were made to Verdun Scott, Arthur McInnarney and Laurie Mills by Mr. R. Newport on behalf of the Schoolboys’ Association for being the first ever products of the Auckland Rugby League school grades to “earn national honours with a team going overseas”. The ceremony concluded with Mr. J.A. Lee, M.P., president of the ARL leading singing of “For They Are Jolly Good Fellows”, and George Nepia and other Māori players singing “Till We Meet Again”.

Senior first grade competitions

Fox Memorial standings
{|
|-
|

Fox Memorial results

Round 1

Round 2
Manukau played against the touring Eastern Suburbs side at 3pm on the number 1 field with just 3 senior club matches played. In the Ponsonby v North Shore match the New Zealand Herald reported that Jack Campbell scored 2 tries however the Auckland Star said that he scored one and Simpson scored the other. The New Zealand Herald had a slightly more detailed description of the match and so Campbell has been attributed with both tries.

Round 3

Round 4
Papakura had their first win of the season beating a Marist side that was missing six of its regular players due to influenza.

Round 5
In the match between Newton and Papakura, Harold Milliken was sent off. The match was said to be marred by rough play and “the referee appeared to treat the incidents too lightly”. It was said that deliberate “spotting” of prominent players “should not be tolerated. In this respect H. Milliken, who was ordered off, must be considered unlucky, as he was badly obstructed on several occasions”.

Round 6
In the match between North Shore and Newton at the Devonport Domain, Newton player Cyril Blacklaws was carried from the field with broken ribs. He missed several months and only returned to play late in the season. City had their bye and travelled to Huntly to play a match.

Round 7
Ex-New Zealand rugby union player Dave Solomon made his debut for Richmond and scored a try. Jack Campbell of the Ponsonby side was reported in the newspaper following this round to have been transferred to Christchurch for work reasons. He was selected for the New Zealand team later in the year. The Ponsonby v Marist match was reported as being 13–7 in both the New Zealand Herald and the Auckland Star however both newspapers only provided details for 10 of Ponsonby's points with a Ponsonby try scorer seemingly omitted.

Round 8

Round 9

Catchup match
On June 5 a match was played between Richmond and Marist. The match was from round 2 but was not played as Manukau were playing the Eastern Suburbs side at Carlaw Park that day and so only 3 club matches could be played. Hadley (Richmond), and Quirke (Newton) were ordered off and both suspended for one match.

Round 10
For Manukau's match against Ponsonby they were missing George Nepia, Jack Hemi, Peter Mahima, and Jack Brodrick, while Ponsonby was missing McManus (who had been injured the previous week in the first minute of the game), whilst Brian Riley went off injured early in the match. William Greer who had begun the season with City transferred to Papakura and played his first match with them against Mount Albert.

Round 11

Round 12
Taranaki played against Northland in a representative match at Carlaw Park as the curtain-raiser to the North Shore v Richmond match. While Manukau hosted Papakura at Waikaraka Park in Onehunga where Manukau were largely based at this time of their existence.

Round 13

Round 14
Bob Banham who had already been selected for the New Zealand tour had to leave the field in his Mount Albert match with Manukau. He returned heavily bandaged and needed stitches afterwards. Hapeta was sent off in the North Shore game with Marist and was later suspended for one match.

Round 15
Alf Broadhead of Richmond was sent off for “reckless tackling” and suspended for one week.

Round 16
With their 8–0 win over North Shore, Mount Albert sealed the championship. It gave them an unassailable 5 pt lead over the same side with only two rounds remaining.

Round 17

Round 18
Despite the fact that Mount Albert had secured the championship the league decided to play the final two rounds to find the runner up. In many seasons the competition would have concluded when the champion was found but a proper runner up was needed to play in the Stormont Shield final against Mount Albert in the event that they also won the Roope Rooster. North Shore beat Manukau to take second place with 21 points ahead of Newton on 19. The Richmond v Ponsonby match did not take place as the result could not have any bearing on second place.

Roope Rooster

Round 1

Round 2

Semifinals

Final

Phelan Shield
The Phelan Shield was played for by teams who were defeated in the first round of the Roope Rooster knockout competition.

Round 1

Round 2

Semifinals

Final

Stormont Shield (champion of champions)

Final
Malcolm Cato kicked a drop goal for Mount Albert after recently having switched from the rugby code. He went overseas to join the war effort in early 1941 and was killed in an aircraft accident on July 16, 1942 aged 25.

Seven-a-side tournament
On April 8 a seven-a-side tournament was held at Carlaw Park between the senior teams prior to the Eastern Suburbs XIII match against Marist.

Top try scorers and point scorers

Senior reserve competitions

Norton Cup standings
{|
|-
|

Norton Cup results
In round 1 Papakura defaulted to Manukau with it being reported during the week that the team had “suffered seriously from influenza”. Following round 16 Richmond were congratulated on securing the championship. Ponsonby appealed the result suffered in that same round claiming that Richmond had played an ineligible player owing to the fact that the match was a ‘final’. They said that he had played 5 matches for the senior side already so should not have been allowed to play. The league said that the game was not a final and so the player was in order.

Stallard Cup (knockout competition)

Senior B grade competitions
In the Sharman Cup Otahuhu won with Ellerslie runner up. The first round featured a bye for Green Lane as Northcote was not able to field a team until round 2. Several results were not reported in any of the Auckland newspapers though Otahuhu winning the competition was reported.

Sharman Cup standings
The standings are incomplete as all teams had match scores unreported (Ellerslie x 2), Green Lane (x1), R.V. (x2), Otahuhu (x2), Point Chevalier (x2), and Northcote (x3).
{|
|-
|

Sharman Cup results
In their round 3 match the entire Green Lane side walked off the field in protest at the referee's decision. The referee was J. Gedye with the “incident occurring shortly before full time”. Point Chevalier were leading 10–6 at the time. Green Lane players stated later “that the play had been clean and that their action had been taken solely in protest to a decision by the referee”. in round 7 referee K. McIvor called off the match before it started because one of the teams only had 8 players after being “handicapped by influenza and injuries to players”. When dealing with the matter later the control board stated that a match should go ahead provided a team had 7 players and “desired to play”. Otahuhu were congratulated on winning the competition following round 10.

Walmsley Shield (knockout competition)
As in previous seasons due to the short nature of the championship competition the Walmsley Shield knockout competition was played over one full round.  The matches were played at neutral venues. In round 4 R.V. defaulted their match and withdrew from the competition owing to illness and injuries. The final was due to be played in late August but Otahuhu were entering the reserve grade knockout competition and so Ellerslie agreed to postpone the Walmesley Shield final until a later date which was ultimately September 9. Otahuhu won the final 5-3 which was played at Manukau. Northcote won the Foster Shield, presumably for finishing the 5 match round in first place (prior to the final).

Walmesley Shield results

Other club matches and lower grades

Lower grade clubs
On October 4 the junior control board advised that Edmund Walter Garrod of the Marist club's third grade team had won the Dickson medal for the most improved player.

Grades were made of the following teams with the winning team in bold:
Third Grade: (Section 1) City Rovers A, Manukau, Marist Old Boys, Mount Albert United, Newton Rangers, Otahuhu Rovers, Papakura (Section 2) Avondale, City Rovers B, Glenora, North Shore Albions, Northcote & Birkenhead Ramblers, Point Chevalier, Ponsonby United, R.V., Richmond Rovers. Otahuhu won the championship after winning a best of three series against Richmond. Otahuhu also won the third grade knockout when they beat Newton 36–4.

Fourth grade Gillett Cup: City Rovers, Green Lane, Manukau, Mount Albert United, Newmarket, North Shore Albions, Northcote & Birkenhead Ramblers, Otahuhu Rovers, Papakura, Ponsonby United, Richmond Rovers. Won jointly by City Rovers and Mount Albert United who drew 11–11 in the final. City Rovers won the knockout competition.
Fifth grade: Avondale, Ellerslie United, Glenora, Marist Old Boys, Newmarket, Papakura, Point Chevalier, Richmond Rovers. Ellerslie won the knockout competition.
Sixth grade: City Rovers, Ellerslie United, Manukau, Mount Albert United, North Shore Albions, Otahuhu Rovers, Richmond Rovers. Richmond beat Otahuhu 8–0 in the championship final while City won the knockout competition.
Seventh grade: City Rovers, Northcote & Birkenhead Ramblers, Papakura, Point Chevalier, Ponsonby United, Richmond Rovers. Papakura win the knockout competition with Ponsonby, Richmond, and Point Chevalier finishing equal second in the knockout.
Schoolboys
Senior (Lou Rout trophy): Ellerslie, Mount Albert, Newton, North Shore, Northcote, Otahuhu, Richmond. Richmond won the knockout competition.
Intermediate (Newport and Eccles Memorial Shield): (Section A) Avondale, Mount Albert, Newton, Richmond, Point Chevalier, Ponsonby (Section B) Ellerslie, Green Lane, Manukau, North Shore, Newmarket, St Patricks. Ponsonby won the knockout competition beating North Shore 5–0. They also won the champion of champions by beating Ellerslie.
Junior: Glenora, Green Lane, Manukau, Newmarket, Northcote, Point Chevalier, St Patricks. Green Lane also won the knockout competition.

Schoolboy gala
A schoolboy gala was held at Carlaw Park On October 14. It featured the final of the fourth grade between Mount Albert and City which resulted in an 11-all draw, along with the crowning of the schoolboys’ queen which was Miss Dick. Other events were held such as running races, goal kicking competitions and a tug-o-war.

Other notable matches

Representative fixtures

Tāmaki (Auckland Māori) v Auckland Pakeha
Ernie Asher was the selector for the Auckland Māori side while R. Doble selected the Auckland Pakeha team. Richmond were playing Marist on the same afternoon and so no players from either team were chosen for the match. Jack Hemi kicked a penalty goal from a yard inside his own half.

Inter Island match
Wally Tittleton was chosen as the North Island captain while Rex King captained the South Island.

New Zealand Probables v New Zealand Possibles
Jack Smith (Possibles) and Bob Banham (Probables) captained the sides.

New Zealand Probables v New Zealand Possibles

Auckland v South Auckland (Waikato)
Stan Prentice was named to coach the Auckland side. George Nepia was originally selected for Auckland but withdrew.

Tāmaki (Auckland Māori) v Bay of Plenty Māori (Waitangi Shield)
This match was originally scheduled to be played on August 17 but was postponed due to the state of Carlaw Park which had been badly affected by the wet weather.

Auckland v Wellington

Auckland Pākehā v Tāmaki (Auckland Māori)
There were no players included in either side from Marist, City, or Richmond, with the later two teams playing in the Phelan Shield final which was the curtain-raiser.

Auckland representative matches played and scoring

Tāmaki (Auckland Māori) representative matches played and scoring

Auckland Pakehā representative matches played and scoring

Annual general meetings and club news

Auckland Rugby League Schools Committee
They held their annual meeting in mid May. President Mr. R.E. Newport congratulated the management on the progress they had made since the competitions inauguration with last year being a “record season”. Officers were elected as follows:- Patron, Dr. M.G. Pezaro; president, Mr. R.E. Newport; chairman of committee, Mr. A. Stanley; secretary, Mr. L Rout; selectors, senior, Mr. S. Dickey; intermediate, Mr. V. Rose. They deiced that where possible grades would be zoned with the season start date “tentatively fixed” for April 27.

Auckland Rugby League Junior Management Committee
The league decided to place on record their appreciation of the services of Mr. W.F. Clarke, the secretary. For the nine seats on the management committee, 13 nominations were received and the club ballot resulted:- D. Wilkie, I. Stonex, C. Howe, E. Chapmen, T. Carey, A. Hopkinson, M.E. McNamara, T. McIntosh and W. Berger, Messrs. Carey and McIntosh are new members. Mr. Wilkie was subsequently reappointed chairman. It was also decided to begin the junior championships on May 29. Mr. A Stanley resigned as chairman of the schools’ management committee in late May. Mr. V. Rose was appointed as deputy-chairman for the remainder of the season.

On July 4 the junior control board decided that all junior players should parade at Carlaw Park on July 22 to farewell the New Zealand team which was touring England and France. At their October 10 meeting it was decided “to confer with the clubs with a view to urging the amalgamation of the senior B and senior reserve grades.

Auckland Rugby League Referees Association]
The annual meeting was held on March 7. Their report stated that she season had been very successful there being many new members. J. Donovan won the Carey Cup for being the most improved referee. Mr. Artie Rae was made a life member. The following officers were elected:-President, Mr Les Edgar Bull; vice-president, Mr G. McGowatt; executive, Messrs. R. Otto, Maurice Wetherill, J. Hawkes; delegates Messrs. William Mincham (Control Board), J. Short (junior management), G. Kelly (schools’ committee), and L.E. Bull (N.Z.R.L. Referees’ Association); official critic, Mr. A. Saunders; honorary secretary, Mr T.E. Skinner; treasurer, Mr A.E. Chapman; appointment board, Messrs. Artie Rae, and M. Renton; social committee, Messrs. A. Saunders, Maurice Wetherill and William Mincham; auditor, Mr Percy Rogers.

On March 27 Percy Rogers was made a life member of the Referees Association. He was an international referee and had been an active member for 16 years as well as being on the executive. At the same meeting the association accepted the resignations of Mr. W.H. Skelton who had accepted a coaching position, and Mr. H.T. Mcintosh who was now a member of the junior management. At the April 4 meeting Mr. William Mincham was made a life member following 25 years of “fine service”. William's son was Ted Mincham the New Zealand representative, and his grand son Robert Mincham would later represent New Zealand also. At the same meeting Mr. Freeman Thompson's resignation was “received with regret”. at their meeting on May 8 Frank Delgrosso, the former New Zealand international and long time Ponsonby player was elected by ballot as a member of the Referees’ Association. On October 1 the referees held their annual picnic at Mr. L. Pauling's farm at Te Atatū. Mr. A Ansell was presented with the Carey Cup for the most improved referee of the season.

Avondale League Football Club
In January the Avondale League Football Club wrote to the New Lynn Borough Council asking if they could use the New Lynn Domain ground for the 1939 season. The council decided that their request “would be given favourable consideration if the ground was suitable”. Avondale held their annual meeting on February 8 at the Labour Party's Rooms in Avondale. At the junior management committee meeting on May 9 they received a report from the Avondale club that they had acquired an area of ground on the Avondale racecourse. In mid June the Avondale club held a “successful fancy dress dance… in aid of funds for their candidate in the schoolboys’ queen competition”. Guests of honour included “members of the Auckland Rugby League ladies’ committee, Mesdames Culpan, Scott, Stonex, Howe, and Chernside, Mr. Ivan Culpan, and Mr. C. Howe”.

City Rovers Football Club
They held their annual meeting on February 27 at Carlaw Park and it was said to be “the most successful in the history of the club”. Mr George Hunt presided with their report emphasising “the fine play of the senior team which contested the final of the Roope Rooster competition”. C. Raynes was made a life member and Mr. Ernie Asher was congratulated on “reaching his 30th year with the club and 32nd year” involved with the sport. The following officers were elected:- Patron, Mr C. Raynes; president, Mr George Hunt; vice-presidents same as last year with power to add; secretary Mr Ernie Asher; treasurer Mr S. Belshaw; auditor Mr E.J. Phelan; club captain, J. Ragg. Hawea Mataira who had last played for City in 1937 was returning to the club after spending 1938 back on the East Coast. In mid March W.K. Greer, the Canterbury rugby representative joined the City side. He was reported “to be a good fullback, with a year’s representative experience as a wing-three quarter”. On July 28 former City player Robert Clark passed away. He had played for City from 1916 to 1920 and represented Auckland in one match in 1919 which was against New Zealand on May 24. He scored a try in the match. Clark was survived by a wife.

On August 28 City held a combined dance with the Ponsonby club at the Metropole Cabaret. The colours used to decorate the venue were blue, black, and red. City held their annual picnic at Tui Glen, Henderson on October 29.

Ellerslie United League Football Club
They held their annual meeting on March 6 at the Parish Hall in Ellerslie with Mr. J. McInnarney presiding. Special mention was made of their senior B side which had won the knockout competition. Their fourth grade team had finished third while their seven-a-side team were runners up in the championship and knockout. Mr. McInnarney was elected a life member. Other officers elected were:- Patron, Mr. A.G. Osborne, M.P.; president, Mr. J. McInnarney; vice-presidents, Messrs. R.H. McIsaac, J. Court, C. Clarke, A. McKenzie, J. Carver, S. Whelan, B. Guy, Finerty, A. Crew, S. Woodhams, J. Pinches, M. Henderson, A. Chapmen; club captain, Mr. F. Chapman; auditors, Messrs. G. Skeen (chairman), R. Hunter, W. Miller, M. Campbell, H. Thomas, A. Strong, H. Johnson, R. Boss, S. Penberton, sen., S. Pemberton, jun., P. Simons, C. Murton, H. Arthur, J. Johnson, S. Harris, C. Spiro and A. Young.

On March 28 at the Ellerslie Borough Council meeting “objections to the curtailment of the number of playing days for the coming season were voiced by a deputation from the Ellerslie League Football Club. Members stated that for the past 14 years the club had been allocated alternate Saturdays during the season. The proposed allocation of one Saturday in three was considered unfair. The club had seven teams and over 100 players who were all local residents. The allocation of the ground for dog-racing was not in keeping with the national physical fitness campaign. The council decided to defer consideration pending replies from the other bodies concerned in the proposed allocation of the ground. In July former vice-president of Ellerslie, Mr. Albert Hutchison Mcintyre died. He was the current deputy Mayor of Ellerslie. On November 1 they held their 21st anniversary dance and prize-giving at St Mary's Hall in Ellerslie.

Glenora Rugby League Football Club
Glenora wrote to the junior management board on June 20 complaining about injuries received due to boot sprigs. The board advised them “that nothing could be done beyond action being taken in conjunction with the Referees’ Association”. While a delegate said that “he had noticed referees inspecting players’ boots recently on various grounds”.

Green Lane Rugby League Club
They reported to the junior management board at their May 9 meeting that Mr. F. Gadd had been appointed secretary for the club. Green Lane advised the league on July 5 that it had decided to invest a portion of its finances in the bonds issued to assist the tour of the New Zealand team. Chairman Campbell said “it was a fine gesture on behalf of the club”.

Manukau Rugby League Football Club
In January the Manukau club entered into negotiations with Ross McKinnon who was “the star of the last Australian team to tour England”. They held their annual meeting at the RSA Hall, Princes Street in Onehunga with Mr S.W. House presiding. Their annual report said it was creditable that the club has contributed five players to the New Zealand tour of Australia. The “placed on record appreciation for the services of their secretary Mr Allen Porter” over the past three years”. The club also noted that they had an urgent need to secure an adequate headquarters and training grounds with the committee authorised to “take steps to obtain them”. The following officers were elected:- President Mr S.W. House; secretary Mr L.G. Healey (vice Mr Allen Porter); treasurer, Mr A Walton; committee, Messrs C. Randrup, H. de Wolfe, J. Brown, and ex office members. They held another gathering on March 9 at the Training Grounds on Galway Street for intending players and supporters, to commence training and to elect a club captain. It was reported on April 28 that Waka McLeod of Tauranga had signed to play for Manukau. He was a Wanganui rugby representative in 1935 and would have played for Taranaki in 1936 but was injured. He then moved back to Tauranga and represented Bay of Plenty in 1937 and 1938. He was 23 years old and weighed 14.5 stone. In mid July it was announced that “a gold medal, donated by Mr. J.F. W. Dickson, for the most sportsmanlike conduct in senior football, was won by J. Hemi” with the presentation to be made at Carlaw Park on July 22 when the New Zealand touring team would be farewelled prior to leaving for England and France.

Marist Old Boys League Football Club
They held their annual meeting on March 2 in the ARL board room with Mr. Joe Sayegh presiding before a “large attendance”. The club was congratulated on it success and the various teams and coaches were referred to. Thanks were “extended to Mr. and Mrs. Glover, W. Cleary, E. McGinn, A. Baird, and S.M. Farrelly for generous practical support”. The following officers were elected:- Patron, his Lordship Bishop Liston; president, Mr. Joe Sayegh; vice-presidents, same as last year, with power to add; hon. secretary, Mr. Jack Kirwan; hon. treasurer, Mr. P Fletcher; club captain, R. Haslam; schoolboys’ delegate, Mr. E. Foster; auditors, Messrs. Hollyrake and B Cotterill; committee Messrs. J. Ball, P. Hughes, F. Webberley, George Copas and W. Maddigan.

Mount Albert United Rugby League Football Club
They held their 11th annual meeting at King George Hall in Mount Albert on February 20. Mr. A.C. Gallagher presided with patron, Mr. H.A. Anderson (Mayor of Mount Albert). ARL chairman Mr. G. Grey Campbell and secretary Ivan Culpan were present. The mayor said that the club “filled a long felt want in the district and he was proud to be identified with it”. The fifth grade team of 1938 was mentioned as it was the first junior team in the club to win a championship. J. Men, of the third grade team won the Mr. J.F.W. Dickson's medal for the most sportsmanlike player in the grade. I. Garrett was awarded the Patron's Cup for the best club schoolboy, C. Allen, of the reserve grade won the Vice-Patron's Cup as best club member, and the President's Trophy for best non-playing member went to A. Jenkinson, coach of the fourth grade and schoolboys. It was also noted that all of the forward pack gained representative honours, Joseph Gunning, Richard Shadbolt, and Bert Leatherbarrow for Auckland, M. Hansen and Jack Tristram for New Zealand Māori, and Des Herring and Clarry McNeil for New Zealand. C. Renton won H. Cotterall's trophy for most improved player. Trophies were given by Mr. Huxford for the best forward and for services rendered were presented to C. Callinan and Claude List, and Frederick List was awarded Mr. Roble's trophy for most consistent forward. Claude List also won the C. Elwin Memorial Cup for the annual 100 yards championship and Eric Cranch won the goal-kicking honours. The club also thanked their supporters the Mount Albert Borough Council and the St. John Ambulance Association. Nine new senior players were “signed at the end of the meeting where the following officers were elected:- Patron, Mr H.A. Anderson; vice-patron, Mr. Arthur Shapton Richards, M.P.; president, Mr. J.R. Johnson (Mr. Gallagher having retired from office), chairman of committee, Mr. R.J. Wilson; club captain, Mr. L. Pearson; honorary secretary, Mr. H.G. Shaw; assistant secretary, Mr. F. Martin; honorary treasurer, Mr. W.E. Schultz; honorary auditor, Mr. S.C. Johnston”. Prior to the start of the season Mount Albert secured the services of Australian Bob Banham who had played and coached in Auckland the previous season. In addition they also signed Bruce Donaldson, the Auckland rugby representative five eighth from the previous season, while R. Cameron was also accompanying Banham from Australia to play. Cameron reportedly weighed 13st 9lb and turned 23 on the day the Mariposa arrived in Auckland on April 3. He had previously played for South Sydney and the Queanbeyan country side.

At the referees meeting on June 12 a complaint was made about the state of Fowlds Park, and the senior delegate was “asked to draw the attention of the control board, with a request for representation of the matter to the Mount Albert Borough Council”

Arthur McInnarney who was selected for the New Zealand team to tour England and France in July received a presentation at his work (the Auckland Star on July 18. At a gathering in their social room at lunchtime Mr. E. Aldridge, “on behalf of employees of New Zealand Newspapers presented [him] with a complete outfit for evening wear, and in doing do said that his fellow workers felt proud of him, seeing that he was the first footballer of the staff ever to be chosen as an overseas representative”. Mr. W. Groves presented him with a dressing case “on behalf of the “Star” Social Club and endorsed the remarks of Mr. Aldridge”.

Newmarket Rugby League Club
The Newmarket club was revived at the start of the season at a general meeting held on February 6 and was granted affiliation as a junior club with the following officers elected: Patron, the Mayor, Mr. S. Donaldson; vice-patron, Mr. E.P. Liddell; president, Mr. E. Buchanan; chairman, Mr. R.E. Newport; honorary secretary, Mr. B.R. Arnott. Delegates: To the junior management, Mr. Moore; to the primary school's management, Mr. O’Connor; honorary treasurer, Mr. Skam; auditor, Mr. H. Wilson.

Newton Rangers Rugby League Football Club
They held their 29th annual meeting at the ARL boardroom on Courthouse Lane “before a large attendance” on February 27. The patron Mr M.J. Hooper “expressed his pleasure at the progress of the game and of the club which he founded just 30 years ago”. The seniors had finished third in the championship and they congratulated Bill McNeight and Wilfred Brimble on their selection to tour Australia. In addition H. Kendall, A. Duncan, J Proctor, A Nathan, and Steve Watene had also gained representative honours. The following officiers were elected:- Patron, Mr. M.J. Hooper, vice-Patron, Mr. W. Monteith; president, Hon. W.E. Parry; vice-presidents, same as last year, with power to add: trustees, Messrs. J. Rutledge and G. Steven; committee, Messrs J.A. Veitch, C. Preston, W. Dyer, D. McKenzie, J.A. Mason, and C Tunnycliffe; secretary treasurer, Mr J. Gibson, auditor Mr. C. Claudett.

North Shore Albions
Their annual meeting was held in the Labour Rooms, Devonport on March 1. On March 15 they sent a delegation headed by Mr. H.J. Gerrard to the control board meeting to suggest “the playing of more competition matches at Devonport. Chairman Campbell said that “due consideration would be given”.

Northcote and Birkenhead Ramblers League Football Club
Their annual meeting was held at the R.S.A. Rooms in Northcote on March 15. On March 28 at the Northcote Borough Council meeting they granted the use of Stafford Park for matches and practices for the season to the Northcote and Birkenhead club. Northcote and Birkenhead Ramblers held their annual ball on June 8 at the King's Theatre in Northcote. It had been organised by the ladies’ committee, comprising Mrs. T. Boyd, Mrs. C. Moore, Mrs. J. Dickson, Mrs. T. Schofield, Mrs. L. Reilly, Mrs. A. Borrows, Mrs. I. Bartulovich, and Miss N. Organ. Mr. Percy May was the master of ceremonies with the dance music played by an orchestra “under Mr. Geoffrey Crawford”. At the June 20 meeting of the junior control board a complaint was heard from the Northcote club regarding “petty thieving at the Outer Domain on June 10”. The board pointed out that it was a case for teams to supervise their possessions and that the league management could “not take responsibility”. On July 18 the club reported to the ARL that their treasurer, Mr. L. Riley, had resigned, and that Mr. C. Watson had been appointed in his place. On July 25 the Northcote club applied to hold a “charge day on Saturday at Stafford Park, Northcote”. The junior control board referred it to the control board “with favourable recommendation”.

Otahuhu Rovers Rugby League Football Club
They held their annual meeting in early March with Mr. C. Hall presiding. He stated that 1938 had been the “most successful since the formation of the club. It won the points Junior Trophy, was runner-up to Richmond in the Senior Points Trophy, won the senior B championship, and the fourth grade knock-out cup. The officers elected were:- Patron, Mr. H.T. Clements; president, Mr. Con Hall; secretary, Mr. Owen McManus; treasurer, Mr. C. Clark; committee, Messrs. W. Clayton, W. Gordon, C. Duane, C. Kelly, A. Porteous, J. Rond, W. Hart, W. McConnell and B. McDonnell. Club captain was J. Rond. O. McManus, assisted by W. McConnell were going to begin training a senior schoolboy team which was scheduled to play curtain-raiser to a touring Australian team at Easter. In late March the Otahuhu club sent a letter to the Otahuhu Borough Council asking for permission to use “Sturges Park for training purposes on the evenings or Tuesday and Thursday each week. On April 17 the Otahuhu Borough Council altered an agreement that the rugby league club could use Sturges Park for trainings on Tuesday and Thursday and instead gave the use of the ground to the rugby union club on those nights. They awarded rugby league the use of the grounds on Wednesdays. The Mayor said that the “council was not biased one way or the other. There are approximately 180 rugby players, against 90 to 100 belonging to the league”. They also decided to charge 12/6 per night instead of 7/6 as previously. On July 24 at their fortnightly meeting the Otahuhu Borough Council decided to “prepare a portion of the pound reserve for the purpose” of a practice ground for the Otahuhu club. The work would be done with No. 13 scheme labour.

In October the club held their annual prize giving. “A highly enthusiastic ladies’ committee in conjunction with club officials, had the pleasure of seeing the annual prize night of the Otahuhu League Football Club, the most successful for many years”. The master of ceremonies was Mr. Walter Arnold and the evening saw many trophies which had been won by teams presented. The senior B team had won their championship and the knockout round, while the third grade “also won similar honours”. “Special trophies were presented to G. Brady, captain of the senior B team; C. Kelly, captain of the third grade; E. Miles, captain of the fourth grade; J. Speedy, captain of the sixth grade; R. Philp, captain of the schoolboys’ team, and J. Peterson, for the most improved schoolboy”. The third grade team gifted presents to Mr and Mrs. C. Brady while C. Kelly accepted the Nicholson Shield on behalf of the same side for being the most “outstanding club side”. Mr. Roud received the Tracy Inglis trophy from the Auckland Rugby League for the leading junior club. The president of the club, Mr. C. Hall who had spent the evening congratulating the members and coaches was presented with a case of pipes for his service.

Papakura Rugby League Club
In late January the Papakura club wrote to the Papakura Borough Council thanking them for the use of the council's “coppers” at their recent picnic. They held their seventh annual meeting on February 28 at the Windsor Theatre in Papakura with “about 60 players” in attendance with president Mr. L. McVeigh presiding. Their report “disclosed a membership of 168, a record for the club” which included 131 playing members and 14 honorary members. The Papakura Amateur Athletic Club had presented a cup to the club to award to the boy who scored the greatest number of points and it was won by Des Bilkey. The club was aiming to field seven teams and their senior sides would begin training the following week. Negative comment was made regarding the reserve grade side with it stated “some members playing if and when, they felt inclined. Why should the club cater for any player who would let his team mates down’ selectors should know what to do with those who prefer racing to football”. Mention was also made of the trips taken during the season to Whangarei and Rotorua, while the third annual picnic had 500 people in attendance. The ladies social committee had organised many dances through the 1938 season and they were thanked. The club decided to make the subscription fee 7/6 for seniors and 5/- for juniors. Mr R Walsh had stated that only about 50 percent of the club had paid their fees the previous season. The annual report showed a credit balance of £118, though a heavy cost to the club was that of transport which amounted to £150. The total receipts were £294 and the clubs assets were valued at £69. The following officers were elected:- Patron, Mr Hugh A. Pollock; president, Mr L. McVeigh; vice presidents, Messrs. W.H.D. Jack, S.N. Godden, W. Cornthwaite, S. Deery, M.J. Dobbing, J. Foggarty, sen., W. Human, E. Kemp, P. Hammond, F.J. Verner, C.H. Chamberlain, G.H. Davis, J. McVeigh, J. Wishart, S.D. Rice, S. Evans, C.W. Jackson, L. Fountain, F. Haynes; secretary to be appointed; treasurer, Mr R. Walsh; club captain, Mr. F. Osborne; committee, Messrs. B. Williams, W. Galloway, G. Wilson, V. Ashby, E.C. Dillicar, S. Schartzfeger, W. Leighton, S.N. Godden, L. Lacassie. At the Papakura Borough Council's meeting in mid March the Papakura club applied for the use of Prince Edward Park for the season, starting on April 1 with training to commence “almost at once”. The rent for the use of the park for the season was set at £10.

In early June the Papakura Post Office held a farewell function for Mr. P. Herkt who was transferring to Wellington. Herky had been a Papakura forward for years. On July 23 Papakura held a “special social function” with about 80 members and supporters in attendance to farewell Harold Milliken who had been chosen for the New Zealand team to tour England and France. Milliken was the Papakura clubs first ever player to be selected to represent New Zealand. He was presented with “a substantial cheque… by the president, Mr. Les McVeagh, who wished him bon voyage and a successful tour. A combination travelling set was presented on behalf of the senior and senior reserve teams by Mr. J. Fogarty, captain of the senior side. Milliken “who replied, was accorded rousing musical honours. Items were given by Messrs Gregor Johnson, T.C. Seaton, Cyril Morris and Dobbyn”. In late July the club sent a letter of complaint regarding the state of Prince Edward Park which was “mud and slush”. The club secretary Mr. R.C. Williams wrote that the “club was deeply concerned about the conditions of the playing area. There was practically no grass in some parts and the mud near the shed where the sheep shelter was three or four inches thick. The Mayor said that the exceptionally bad weather was in a large measure responsible, but any damage by the sheep would be counteracted by the good they would do later on. It was decided to put a load or two of metal round the pavilion and pass on the matter to the reserves committee with power to act”.

In early September the Papakura Borough Council received a letter of complaint about the state of Prince Edward Park from the rugby league club particularly focussing on the playing area where the drain was not dealing with the flooding from recent rains. They also complained about several of the electric lights being broken and that the shed was in “an untidy condition” and often unlocked. On October 25 it was reported in the Franklin Times that the league club had taken over the scouts hall for training purposes. It would be fitted as a gymnasium and have “some useful equipment including overhanging rings, wrestling ring, vaulting horse, etc”. The club had received advice from the Athletic Centre in Auckland, and “a qualified instructor will be in attendance at the start of training which will begin very shortly. The training will be open for all members from boys to seniors”.

Pt. Chevalier Rugby League Football Club
Point Chevalier held a special general meeting on December 5, 1938, which resulted in a change to the club name from "The Pt. Chevalier Social and Sports Club (Incorporated)" to "Pt. Chevalier Rugby League Football Club". Their annual meeting was held at Armstrong's Hall on March 6. At the farewell for the New Zealand rugby league team at Carlaw Park on July 22 the Point Chevalier club were awarded a special trophy. The trophy was judged by ballot and was awarded based on “dress, marching and field conduct”.

Ponsonby United Football Club
A special general meeting was held on January 23 at their club rooms on 85 Jervois Road to look at altering Rule 11 of their constitution. They held their annual meeting at Curran Street Hall with Mr. J. Arnell presiding. The annual report noted that “a pleasing feature was the increase in player and general membership”. Representative honours had been “won by Arthur Kay, C. Petersen, E. Morgan, Jack Campbell, and Brian Riley. Mr. L. Mortensen who had been officially connected with the club since 1910 was made a life member and he was presented with his life membership badge. The financial statement showed a profit of £50 for the season’s working. Their dance and social committee’s activities had raised £40. The assets were shown at £221 and liabilities “nil”. Officers were elected as follows:- Patron Mr W.E. Grant; president, Mr J. Arneil; vice presidents same as last year with power to add; committee, Messrs. R. Francis (chairman), D. Malavey, R. Carlaw, D. Campbell, and B. Brown; secretary Mr. W. Grieves; treasurer Mr T.G. McKeown; club captain, Mr P. Rush; senior selector, Mr Gordon Campbell, auditor, Mr Graham.

On April 26 it was reported that Ponsonby was gaining the services of Frank Bell who had visited Auckland the previous season whilst playing for Eastern Suburbs on their tour. He was said to be able to play in any position and weighed 13st. 4lb. He had played at St. Joseph's College. On August 28 Ponsonby held a combined dance with the City Rovers club at the Metropole Cabaret. The colours used to decorate the venue were blue, black, and red.

R.V. Club
They held their annual meeting in the Y.M.C.A rooms on February 28, there was a good muster of players with a number of new members. A vote of thanks was made by the players and committee to Mr. E. Mullar, chairman and Mr. G. Dines, secretary for their service over the past two years with regret that they were resigning. Mrs. Dines received a presentation for her “valuable assistance” to the committee. The following officers were elected:- Patron, Mr. A.G. Harvey, chairman and president, Mr. W. Halverson, vice-presidents Messrs. W. Harvey, sen., A. Harvey, W. Harvey, jun., R. Harvey, D. Harvey, A. Harvey jun., F. Martin, W. Best, G. Martin, G. Taberner, C. Couper, W. Gussey, G. McGehan, R. Simpson, C. Hamilton, E. Griffiths, C. Smith, A. Cloke; secretary, R. McMilne, treasurer, W. Hamlen, committee, F. Derson, McLean, T. Adams, E. Knight, C. Lyons, T. Vercoe; club captain, E. Mullar; delegate, K. McMilne, coaches, W. Hanlen, L. Barchard, Heron.

Richmond Rovers Football Club

They held their annual meeting on February 27 at their club rooms at Grey Lynn Park in late February. It was said to be “crowded” with Mr. Ben W. Davis presiding. The success of the club from 1938 was noted as they won the senior reserve championship, along with the third and seventh grades as well as the senior and intermediate school grades. They also won knockout competitions in the senior, senior reserve, third, sixth, and seventh grades and the senior and intermediate school competitions. Wally Tittleton, Jack Satherley, Harold Tetley, and Jack McLeod all toured Australia with the New Zealand team. The following officers were elected:- Patron, Mr. J. Redwood (sen); president, Mr. Ben W. Davis; vice-presidents, same as last year; committee chairman, Mr. W.A. Swift; secretary and treasurer, Mr. W.R. Dick; club captain, Mr. Ralph Jenkinson; school delegate Mr. E.J. McCarthy; auditor, Mr. J.A. Redwood. The club also welcomed “a number of new players”. They held their annual picnic at Henderson Domain on November 26.

Senior grade registration and transfers
On March 1 there were two registration applications from Rotorua and J.E. Airey, the Canterbury representative hooker was registered with City Rovers. The Herald reported from the same meeting that Hawea Mataira, P.J. Johnson, J. Gould, W.J. Knox, H. Hulton, and N. Hulton were all registered with City. On March 22 Jack Turner formerly of Eastern Suburbs in Sydney was registered and joined Newton. Mortimer Stephens (playing with Rochdale previously) and Cyril Blacklaws also applied to play again for their old Newton club. Other players registered were T.E. Lawrence, W. White (Newton), R. Shilling, B.W. McDonald (City); R.G. Day (City); A.J. Sayers (Richmond); L. Cremer (Ponsonby). On March 28 the following applications for membership were approved: William K. Greer, H. Hulton, and N. Hulton (City), Harold Milliken (Papakura), J.B. (Bruce) Donaldson (Mount Albert), E. Montague, D. Ravell (Newton), D. Morgan, F.B. Schroder (North Shore), M. Puckey, J. Munro, J. Marsh (Manukau).

On April 5 the following players had their applications for playing membership approved:- C. Halford (Newton), T.A. Field (North Shore), S. Broadhead, K. Bjerk, L. McCready (Richmond); A. Smith (City), P. Awhitu, Cyril Wiberg, P. Kauhoa, George Nepia (Manukau), J. McManus, W. Goosman, H.W. Brown (Ponsonby); H.H. McKay (Papakura). On April 18 J. McManus was transferred from Otahuhu senior B to Ponsonby seniors. On April 19 the following applications for membership were approved:- H. Flannagan, P. Kelly, K.S. Kelcher, T.J. Chester (Ponsonby); Bob Banham, L. Clement (Mount Albert), J.W. Gillgren, K. Walker, J. Thompson (City); W.N. Sarsfield, M. Smythe (Newton); W.J. Reeves, Trevor Clifford Hosken (Papakura). While the following transfers were approved:- H. Zane (Manukau to North Shore); M. Pitt (Mount Albert to North Shore); V. Newcombe (Ponsonby to North Shore); F.C. Wells, (Ponsonby to Papakura); H. Collins (Mount Albert to Manukau). On April 26 for following registrations occurred:- J.E. Gallagher (Marist), W. Purves (Richmond), W.H. Smith (City). T. Yates transferred from Mount Albert to Ponsonby, while D. Williams transferred from Richmond to Ponsonby.

On May 3 T. Jones and D.N.R. Gemmell were registered with City, W. Paki (Pokeno), L. Wilson, and J Hapi with Manukau, and C Whiu with Mount Albert. The same evening D. Fraser appealed the refusal of Newton to grant him a transfer to North Shore. Newton claimed that they had a place in their reserve grade team for him and he was “first call for the top team forwards”. On May 9 B. Armitage transferred from Point Chevalier senior B to Northcote, G.S. Bodman and T. Kelley transferred from Papakura seniors to Green Lane senior B, while J. Couper was regraded from Ponsonby reserves to R.V. senior B, and S. Thomason from Mount Albert senior reserve to senior B. On May 10 the control board was advised by cablegram that Frank Bell's transfer had been cleared from New South Wales and he was registered with the Ponsonby club. The following memberships were approved:- S. Hapeta (North Shore), W.R. Walker (Manukau), P.J. McVerry, J. Logan (Marist), H.G. Freeman (Newton), K.B. Johnson (North Shore), and W. Goodwin (Ponsonby). On May 17 the following players were transferred: I. Ziegler (Newton to North Shore reserves), L. Bell (City seniors to senior B), J. Cortese (R.V. senior B to Manukau seniors). The following players were registered: W. Birch (Newton), Owen Cyril Wilkie (formerly of Richmond, with North Shore), S. Anderson (formerly of St. George in Sydney, with Newton subject to clearance from New South Wales). R.K. Andrews was reinstated to rugby league. Frank Bell from Eastern Suburbs was also officially cleared by New South Wales. B.L. Seagar was transferred from Newton reserves to North Shore, A.G. Osborne from Wellington to Ellerslie, B. Ormond and J Hapeta from Rotorua to Mount Albert and North Shore respectively. On May 24 the following players were transferred, J. Darwin (North Shore reserves to City reserves), H.W. Brown (Ponsonby reserves to North Shore reserves), G. Molesworth (Ngaruawahia seniors to Otahuhu senior B). The following regrades was approved:- J.J. Daley (City to Green Lane senior B). While Dave Solomon was registered with Richmond, as was E. Eastwood with Papakura. J. Little (Point Chevalier), and J.C. Harris (Otahuhu) were both reinstated. On May 31 the following players were granted transfers:- Graham M. Simpson (Ponsonby to City), B. Kelly (Ponsonby to North Shore), R.J. Smith was registered as a playing member of North Shore. Simpson was a Manawatu rugby union representative player.

On June 1 Jack O’Brien transferred from South Auckland to Auckland, while M. Pitman transferred from Northland to Auckland. On June 7 the following players were registered:- J. Herbert (Newton), A. McSweeney (City), Andrew Samuel Kronfeld (Richmond), and B. Kelly (North Shore). William K. Greer transferred from City to Papakura. On June 14 the following players were registered:- O.N. Sanderson (Mount Albert), R.G. Taylor (Marist), E. Clarke and E. Smith (City), and K Mills (Richmond). On 16 June W. Pitman transferred from Whangarei to City Rovers, and S. Thomassen transferred from Portland (Whangarei) to Mount Albert. On June 21 the following players had their applications for playing membership approved:- M. Housham and C. McDevitt (Newton); J.L. Sullivan (City); C.E. Dowling (Mount Albert); Fred Wolfe Moss, and James P. Moss (Marist). On June 28 W. Wharenui transferred to Papakura from Manukau, S. Anderson from Eastern Suburbs (NSW) to Newton. L. Bover registered with Newton, and R. Bond with City. Hutchinson was regraded from City seniors to their 3rd grade side.

On July 5 the following applications for senior membership were approved:- Robert Cheater (North Shore), J. Howe, O.C. Hudson (Marist), G. Brown, J Bourdot, H. Perry (North Shore). H.M. Emus were both reinstated. On July 12 George Edwin Raisbeck was registered with Point Chevalier, and I. McGregor (of Glenmore) with City. H.S. Skinner transferred from Newton to Point Chevalier and was regraded to senior B. On July 19 applications for playing membership were approved:- W.C. McKinnon (Mount Albert), and B.M. McKelvie (Marist). On July 26 Fredrick Leonard Schultz was transferred from Papakura to Mount Albert. At the same meeting W. Briggs and C. Saunders transferred from South Auckland to Auckland. J. Rose (Newton), and A.R. Hall (North Shore) applied for registration at the bracketed clubs. On August 2 G.R. Kerr transferred from North Shore to Papakura, and R. Broughton was registered with City On August 15 J. Hapi (City), and Steve Watene (Newton) transferred to Manukau. On August 23 the following players were registered:- J. Gregory (Manukau), A. Gray (Papakura), H. Roxburgh, and V.T. Rutherford (Ponsonby). Ted Mincham was transferred from Mount Albert to Richmond.

On September 6 A. Phillips transferred from Hikurangi to Auckland. He was registered with Otahuhu. A.J. Johnson was registered with the North Shore club.

References

External links
 Auckland Rugby League Official Site

Auckland Rugby League seasons